The 2020–21 NCAA Division I women's basketball season began in November 2020 and ended with the championship game of the 2021 NCAA Division I women's basketball tournament at the Alamodome in San Antonio, Texas on April 4, 2021. Practices officially began in October 2020.

Season headlines
 September 17 – The NCAA officially announced that both men's and women's basketball season is permitted to begin on November 25. 
 September 24 – One week after the NCAA's announcement, the Pac-12 permitted play to begin on that date. The Pac-12 had previously barred play until 2021. This ruling left the Ivy League as the only conference not yet allowing play to begin on November 25.
 October 14 – The NCAA announced that all student-athletes in winter sports during the 2020–21 school year, including men's and women's basketball, would receive an extra year of athletic eligibility, whether or not they or their teams play during that school year.
 October 27 – Bethune–Cookman, which had previously canceled its 2020 fall sports due to COVID-19 concerns, announced that none of its other teams, including men's and women's basketball, would play in the 2020–21 school year.
 November 12
 Cal State Northridge announced that it would not play in the 2020–21 season after six players opted out of the season and a seventh was unable to enter the U.S. due to travel restrictions, leaving the Matadors with only six available players.
 The Ivy League became the first conference to cancel all winter sports for the 2020–21 season, including men's and women's basketball, due to COVID-19 concerns.
 November 19 – Maryland Eastern Shore became the second MEAC program to opt out of all remaining 2020–21 sports, including men's and women's basketball, due to COVID-19 concerns.
 November 23 – Florida A&M became the third MEAC member to opt out of the 2020–21 season due to COVID-19 concerns. Unlike the previous two MEAC members to opt out, FAMU only opted out of women's basketball at that time.
 December 14 – The NCAA announces that the 2021 NCAA Division I women's basketball tournament will be held in one geographic area. The original host of the Final Four, San Antonio, and surrounding areas began preliminary discussions to host the entire 64-team tournament.
 December 25 – Duke University canceled the remainder of its women's basketball season, citing player concerns over COVID–19.
 December 29 – Southern Methodist University canceled the remainder of its women's basketball season, citing player concerns over COVID–19.
 December 31 - South Carolina makes a claim to the 2019-20 season mythical national championship based on poll results in the SEC season-opener against Florida.
 January 6 – Dixie State University canceled the remainder of its women's basketball season, citing player concerns over COVID–19.
 January 14
 The University of Virginia canceled the remainder of its women's basketball season, citing player concerns over COVID–19.
 San Jose State University canceled the remainder of its women's basketball season, citing player concerns over COVID–19.
 January 18 – Vanderbilt University canceled the remainder of its women's basketball season, citing player concerns over COVID–19.
 January 21 – The University of Detroit Mercy canceled the remainder of its women's basketball season. The school's announcement came four days after the parents of all 14 players sent a letter to UDM athletic director Robert Vowels Jr. alleging rampant player mistreatment by first-year head coach AnnMarie Gilbert.
 January 24 – The University of Vermont canceled the remainder of its women's basketball season, citing player concerns over COVID–19.
 January 29 – UMBC canceled the remainder of its women's basketball season, citing player concerns over COVID–19.
 February 3 – South Carolina State University canceled the remainder of its women's basketball season, citing player concerns over COVID–19.
 February 4 – Canisius College canceled the remainder of its women's basketball season, citing player concerns over COVID–19.
 February 10 – The University of Hartford canceled the remainder of its women's basketball season, citing player concerns over COVID–19.
 February 12 – The College of William & Mary canceled the remainder of its women's basketball season, citing player concerns over COVID–19.
 February 18 – Colgate University canceled the remainder of its women's basketball season, citing player concerns over COVID–19.
 February 23 – St. Francis (BKN) canceled the remainder of its women's basketball season, citing player concerns over COVID–19.
 February 25 – The University of San Diego canceled the remainder of its women's basketball season, citing player concerns over COVID–19.
 March 2 – Hampton University canceled the remainder of its women's basketball season, citing player concerns over COVID–19.
 March 3 – Delaware State University canceled the remainder of its women's basketball season, citing player concerns over COVID–19.

Milestones and records
 January 9 – In what was believed to be the first-ever coaching matchup of a father and daughter in Division I basketball, Holy Cross, coached by Maureen Magarity, defeated Army, coached by her father Dave Magarity, 80–46.
 January 28 – In an 83–71 upset of then-#2 NC State, Virginia Tech set a new Division I women's record for most points in an overtime period with 26, which also tied the D-I men's mark.

Conference membership changes
Ten schools joined new conferences for the 2020–21 season, including four transitioning from Division II.

Arenas

New arenas
 James Madison opened Atlantic Union Bank Center on November 25, 2020 with a men's and women's doubleheader. The women defeated Mount St. Mary's 69–55 in the second game.
 Liberty won the first event in Liberty Arena, which had officially opened on November 23, 2020, with a 76–53 win over Norfolk State on December 1.

Arenas of new D-I teams
Three of the four new D-I members for this season use existing on-campus facilities:
 Dixie State plays in Burns Arena.
 Tarleton State plays in Wisdom Gym.
 UC San Diego plays in RIMAC Arena.
The other D-I newcomer, Bellarmine, announced a multi-year deal with the Kentucky State Fair Board on November 2, 2020 to play home games at Freedom Hall, located at the Kentucky Exposition Center near Louisville Muhammad Ali International Airport. Before the opening of the downtown KFC Yum! Center in 2010, Freedom Hall had been the full-time home of Louisville men's basketball for more than 50 years, and had also been at least the part-time home of Louisville women's basketball since that team's establishment in 1975. Due to COVID-19 restrictions, Bellarmine could only seat 300 at its on-campus facility, Knights Hall. With Freedom Hall's basketball capacity of 18,252, the Knights were able to seat 2,700.

Arenas closing
 High Point had originally planned to open Nido and Mariana Qubein Arena and Conference Center for the 2020–21 season. However, construction delays brought on by COVID-19 led to the university delaying the new arena's opening until 2021–22, meaning that the Millis Center was used for one more season.
 This was originally intended to be Idaho's final season at the Kibbie Dome, also home to Idaho football, with the facility's basketball configuration known as Cowan Spectrum. When Idaho football moved its 2020 season to spring 2021, it forced Idaho men's and women's basketball to move their entire home schedules to Memorial Gymnasium, which had been a secondary home to both teams since the Kibbie Dome opened in 1976, as well as the full-time home to both before that time. The school plans to open the new Idaho Central Credit Union Arena for the 2021–22 season. The Dome will remain in use for football and several other sports.

Temporary arenas
To be added.

Season outlook

Pre-season polls

The top 25 from the AP and USA Today Coaches Polls.

Regular season

Early season tournaments
Early season tournaments are TBA, although many have canceled and others are unlikely to occur.

Upsets
An upset is a victory by an underdog team. In the context of NCAA Division I Women's Basketball, this generally constitutes an unranked team defeating a team currently ranked in the Top 25. This list will highlight those upsets of ranked teams by unranked teams as well as upsets of #1 teams. Rankings are from the AP poll.
Bold type indicates winning teams in "true road games"—i.e., those played on an opponent's home court (including secondary homes).

Conference winners and tournaments
Each of the 31 Division I athletic conferences that played in 2020–21 ended its regular season with a single-elimination tournament. The team with the best regular-season record in each conference was given the number one seed in each tournament, with tiebreakers used as needed in the case of ties for the top seeding. Unless otherwise noted, the winners of these tournaments received automatic invitations to the 2021 NCAA Division I women's basketball tournament.

Statistical leaders

Postseason

NCAA tournament

Tournament upsets
For this list, an "upset" is defined as a win by a team seeded 7 or more spots below its defeated opponent.

Conference standings

Award winners

All-America teams

The NCAA has never recognized a consensus All-America team in women's basketball. This differs from the practice in men's basketball, in which the NCAA uses a combination of selections by the Associated Press (AP), the National Association of Basketball Coaches (NABC), the Sporting News, and the United States Basketball Writers Association (USBWA) to determine a consensus All-America team. The selection of a consensus team is possible because all four organizations select at least a first and second team, with only the USBWA not selecting a third team.
 
Before the 2017–18 season, it was impossible for a consensus women's All-America team to be determined because the AP had been the only body that divided its women's selections into separate teams. The USBWA first named separate teams in 2017–18. The women's counterpart to the NABC, the Women's Basketball Coaches Association (WBCA), continues the USBWA's former practice of selecting a single 10-member (plus ties) team. The NCAA does not recognize Sporting News as an All-America selector in women's basketball.

Major player of the year awards
Wooden Award: Paige Bueckers, UConn
Naismith Award: Paige Bueckers, UConn
Associated Press Player of the Year: Paige Bueckers, UConn
Wade Trophy: NaLyssa Smith, Baylor
Ann Meyers Drysdale Women's Player of the Year (USBWA): Paige Bueckers, UConn
ESPN.com National Player of the Year: Paige Bueckers, UConn

Major freshman of the year awards
Tamika Catchings Award (USBWA): Paige Bueckers, UConn and Caitlin Clark, Iowa
 WBCA Freshman of the Year: Paige Bueckers, UConn and Caitlin Clark, Iowa
 ESPN.com Freshman of the Year: Paige Bueckers, UConn

Major coach of the year awards
Associated Press Coach of the Year: Brenda Frese, Maryland
Naismith College Coach of the Year: Tara VanDerveer, Stanford
 USBWA National Coach of the Year: Tara VanDerveer, Stanford
WBCA National Coach of the Year: Wes Moore, NC State
 ESPN.com Coach of the Year: Brenda Frese, Maryland
 WBCA Assistant Coach of the Year: Stephanie Norman, Louisville

Other major awards
 Naismith Starting Five:
 Nancy Lieberman Award (top point guard): Paige Bueckers, UConn
 Ann Meyers Drysdale Award (top shooting guard): Ashley Owusu, Maryland
 Cheryl Miller Award (top small forward): Ashley Joens, Iowa State
 Katrina McClain Award (top power forward): NaLyssa Smith, Baylor
 Lisa Leslie Award (top center): Aliyah Boston, South Carolina
 WBCA Defensive Player of the Year: Natasha Mack, Oklahoma State
 Naismith Women's Defensive Player of the Year: Natasha Mack, Oklahoma State
 Becky Hammon Mid-Major Player of the Year Award: Kierstan Bell, Florida Gulf Coast
Senior CLASS Award (top senior on and off the court): Rennia Davis, Tennessee
Maggie Dixon Award (top rookie head coach): Kyra Elzy, Kentucky
Academic All-American of the Year (top scholar-athlete): Aliyah Boston, South Carolina
Elite 90 Award (top GPA among upperclass players at Final Four): Sam Thomas, Arizona
Pat Summitt Most Courageous Award: Not presented in 2021, although the men's version of this award was presented.

Coaching changes

See also

2020–21 NCAA Division I men's basketball season

Footnotes

References